The Westside is a district of the city centre of Birmingham, England, which includes many new and planned buildings such as The Cube, Library of Birmingham, Ikon Gallery, Trident House and Regal Tower.

Metro expansion 
A 2.15km long metro expansion, holding the distinction of being the country's only metro system to completely operate on battery, is also planned for this area. It is to be rolled out in two phases, by December 2019 and 2021 respectively. On 16 April 2021 the last piece of track was welded into place on Hagley Road. With this passenger services to a new terminus at 54 Hagley Road will commence later in 2021.

Areas

Located within the Westside is Brindleyplace, consisting of the National Sealife Centre and Number 9 The Gallery. Adjacent to this is the International Convention Centre (ICC) and Symphony Hall. Other performance venues in the area are the National Indoor Arena (NIA) and the Birmingham Repertory Theatre ("The Rep"). Broad Street in Westside is a popular nightlife destination in Birmingham and home to many posh European restaurants, canal-side bars and night clubs. Broad Street cuts through the area, as do numerous canals. The canal network in the area consists of features such as Old Turn Junction and Gas Street Basin.

The Mailbox is an upmarket shopping centre and hotel adjacent to the canals and provides offices for the BBC. Many other media companies have offices in the Convention Quarter such as BRMB, Galaxy, Heart FM and ITV Carlton.

See also 
 Big City Plan

References

Areas of Birmingham, West Midlands